The 1970 Baltimore Orioles season involved the Orioles finishing first in the American League East with a record of 108 wins and 54 losses, 15 games ahead of the runner-up New York Yankees. The Orioles put together one of the most dominant postseason runs of all time, scoring 60 runs in just eight games as they swept the Minnesota Twins for the second straight year in the American League Championship Series and then went on to win their second World Series title over the National League champion Cincinnati Reds in five games, thanks to the glove of third baseman Brooks Robinson.

The team was managed by Earl Weaver, and played their home games at Memorial Stadium.

Offseason 
 December 1, 1969: Tom Shopay was drafted by the Orioles from the New York Yankees in the 1969 rule 5 draft.
 January 17, 1970: Doug DeCinces was drafted by the Orioles in the 3rd round of the 1970 Major League Baseball Draft (Secondary Phase).

Regular season

Bouncing back from 1969 
Following their upset loss to the New York Mets in the 1969 World Series, the Orioles picked up where they left off in 1969. They opened the season with five wins and ran away with their second straight American League East title, beating back a challenge from the New York Yankees in June. They won 19 of their last 22 games to finish with a 108-win season, one win fewer than the previous year.

The team was mostly the same as 1969. Starting pitchers Mike Cuellar, Dave McNally, and Jim Palmer each won at least 20 games, and the veteran bullpen seldom faltered. On defense, Brooks Robinson, center fielder Paul Blair, and second baseman Davey Johnson won Gold Gloves. Offensively, first baseman Boog Powell was the AL's Most Valuable Player, leading the team with 35 home runs and 114 RBIs. Don Buford and Blair continued to get on base, and Frank Robinson (.306, 25 home runs), Brooks Robinson (94 RBIs), and Powell continued to drive them home. Elrod Hendricks led a catching platoon that produced 17 homers and 74 RBIs, and outfielder Merv Rettenmund, a product of the farm system, hit .322 with 18 home runs and 58 RBI. The Minnesota Twins were the only team in the American League to have a winning record in the regular season versus the Baltimore Orioles.

Injury to Paul Blair 
There was a sobering moment early in the season when Blair was beaned on May 31 in Anaheim, California. The California Angels' Ken Tatum threw a pitch that hit Blair in the face. Blair was seemingly on his way to a second straight strong season after having 26 home runs and 76 RBIs in 1969. He missed three weeks after the beaning, coming back to finish with 18 home runs and 65 RBIs, but he seldom produced that well over the rest of his career, and some speculated he was never the same at the plate.

The return of Moe Drabowsky 
One personnel change from '69 to '70 was the return of Moe Drabowsky, the eminent prankster relief pitcher who had been lost to the Kansas City Royals in the expansion draft before the '69 season. Now 34 and near the end of his career, he was reacquired during the '70 season and won four of six decisions, helping fill out a veteran bullpen.

Season standings

Record vs. opponents

Notable transactions 
 June 4, 1970: Rob Andrews was drafted by the Orioles in the 10th round of the 1970 Major League Baseball Draft.

Roster

Player stats

Batting

Starters by position 
Note: Pos = Position; G = Games played; AB = At bats; H = Hits; Avg. = Batting average; HR = Home runs; RBI = Runs batted in

Other batters 
Note: G = Games played; AB = At bats; H = Hits; Avg. = Batting average; HR = Home runs; RBI = Runs batted in

Pitching

Starting pitchers 
Note: G = Games pitched; IP = Innings pitched; W = Wins; L = Losses; ERA = Earned run average; SO = Strikeouts

Other pitchers 
Note: G = Games pitched; IP = Innings pitched; W = Wins; L = Losses; ERA = Earned run average; SO = Strikeouts

Relief pitchers 
Note: G = Games pitched; W = Wins; L = Losses; SV = Saves; ERA = Earned run average; SO = Strikeouts

Postseason

ALCS 

The Orioles win the series over the Minnesota Twins in three straight games.

World Series 

AL Baltimore Orioles (4) vs. NL Cincinnati Reds (1)

Awards and honors 
 Boog Powell, American League MVP
 Brooks Robinson, Babe Ruth Award
 Brooks Robinson, World Series MVP

Farm system 

LEAGUE CHAMPIONS: Miami, Bluefield

Notes

References 

1970 Baltimore Orioles team page at Baseball Reference
1970 Baltimore Orioles season at baseball-almanac.com

Baltimore Orioles seasons
Baltimore Orioles
American League East champion seasons
American League champion seasons
World Series champion seasons
Baltimore Orioles